Araeomolis rhodographa is a species of moth in the family Erebidae. It was described by George Hampson in 1901. It is found in French Guiana, Venezuela, Colombia, Bolivia, Panama, Suriname and the Brazilian state of Amazonas.

Subspecies
Araeomolis rhodographa rhodographa (Colombia)
Araeomolis rhodographa peruviana Rothschild, 1909 (Peru)

References

Phaegopterina
Moths described in 1901
Moths of South America
Moths of Central America